The 1906 Australasian Championships (now known as the Australian Open) was a tennis tournament played on the grass court at Hagley Park in Christchurch, New Zealand the event is a part of the Grand Slam. It was the second edition of the tournament and was held from 26 to 31 December 1906. Anthony Wilding won the singles title.

Finals

Singles

 Anthony Wilding defeated  Francis Fisher, 6–0, 6–4, 6–4.

Doubles
 Rodney Heath /  Anthony Wilding defeated  Cecil C. Cox /  Harry Parker, 6–2, 6–4, 6–2.

References

External links
 Australian Open Official website

 
1906 in Australian tennis
1906 in New Zealand sport
1906
Sport in Christchurch
December 1906 sports events